"Wrecking Ball" is a 1989 song by Neil Young, included in the album Freedom. The song was covered by American singer Emmylou Harris.

Composition
The song was written by Neil Young. Rather than referring to a real demolition wrecking ball, the lyrics are wordplay and the song refers to a dance or ball. Aside from the 1989 album version "Wrecking Ball" exists also in a different version with a separate set of lyrics.

Young sang harmony on the Emmylou Harris version, which became the title track of the Grammy Award-winning album Wrecking Ball. Although the song was released by Harris as a 2-track CD single with Lucinda Williams' "Sweet Old World", reviewers did not consider the title track the high point on the album.

References

1989 songs
Neil Young songs
Songs written by Neil Young
Song recordings produced by Neil Young
Song recordings produced by Niko Bolas